Biwali Bayles (born 15 February 2002) is an Australian professional basketball player for the Sydney Kings of the National Basketball League (NBL).

Early life
Biwali Bayles was born on 15 February 2002 in Brisbane. He moved to the Sydney suburb of Redfern with his family when he was one or two years old, and grew up in The Block, which is home to him. He was a big fan of the Broncos player Jharal Yow Yeh, and at one point wanted to make a career out of rugby league football, until his mother suggested giving basketball a try.

College career 
Bayles committed to playing college basketball at Hawaii in January 2020.

He led the team in assists per game (2.6) in his lone season with the program, while also averaging 6.2 points per game. He also hit a three-point shot against Cal State Northridge that would prove to be the game-winning shot for Hawaii.

Bayles left the program in March 2021 to turn professional and play in Australia. He said afterwards that it had been a good experience, but he had not had enough time on the court, and "at the end of the day, I didn’t really feel like it was for me".

Professional career

Sydney Kings (2021–present) 
Bayles signed with the Sydney Kings on 27 April 2021. He helped the Kings win the 2022 NBL championship.

On 14 January 2023, it was announced that Bayles would be taking paid leave of absence from Kings for the rest of the 2022–23 season. The Kings went on to win the 2023 NBL championship.

National team career 
Bayles won a gold medal at the FIBA U17 Oceania Championships in 2019 playing for the Australia national under-17 team. He has also been a member of the Australia national under-19 team, playing for them at the 2021 FIBA U19 World Cup.

Career statistics

College 

|-
| 2020–21 
| align=left|Hawaii
| 21 || 12 || 19.3 || .404 || .432 || .697 || 3.1 || 2.6 || 0.6 || 0.1 || 6.2

References

External links 
 Biwali Bayles at Sydney Kings
 Hawaii Rainbow Warriors profile

2002 births
Living people
Sportspeople from Brisbane
Basketball players from Sydney
Point guards
Shooting guards
Hawaii Rainbow Warriors basketball players
Sydney Kings players
Indigenous Australian basketball players